is a Japanese football player. He plays for Blaublitz Akita.

Club statistics
Updated to 26 November 2022.

References

External links
Profile at Azul Claro Numazu
Profile at SC Sagamihara

1993 births
Living people
Kanto Gakuin University alumni
Association football people from Fukuoka Prefecture
Japanese footballers
J2 League players
J3 League players
SC Sagamihara players
Azul Claro Numazu players
Blaublitz Akita players
Association football midfielders